Jacob Dominico Borg (born 22 May 1991) is a professional footballer who last played as a defender for Finn Harps. Borg has been capped at senior level for Malta and at youth level for Australia.

Early life
Borg was born in Wollongong, New South Wales and spent his early life in the Illawarra region.

Career
After stints with the Gold Coast FC youth team and the Dandaloo FC, Borg moved to Malta, where he held citizenship by descent, to try his luck. In 2012, he signed with Balzan.

In July 2018, he joined Finn Harps in the League of Ireland First Division.

International career
Borg was a member of the Australian squad that played at the 2009 Australian Youth Olympic Festival, playing in all three Australian matches at the tournament.

Soon after moving to Malta, he was called up to the Malta squad that played Northern Ireland in February 2013, though he didn't make his debut until September of that year in a friendly match against Azerbaijan.

References

External links
 
 

1991 births
Living people
People with acquired Maltese citizenship
Maltese footballers
Malta international footballers
Australian soccer players
Australian people of Maltese descent
Association football defenders
Gold Coast United FC players
Balzan F.C. players
Sliema Wanderers F.C. players
Żebbuġ Rangers F.C. players
Gżira United F.C. players